Héctor Daniel Romero (born 20 March 1985) is an Argentinian football defender who plays for Villa Mitre of the Torneo Argentino B in Argentine.

References

External links
 Daniel Romero at BDFA.com.ar 
 Daniel Romero – Argentine Primera statistics at Fútbol XXI 

1985 births
Living people
Footballers from Buenos Aires
Argentine footballers
Club de Gimnasia y Esgrima La Plata footballers
Argentine expatriate footballers
Shahrdari Bandar Abbas players
Expatriate footballers in Iran
FC Jūrmala players
Expatriate footballers in Latvia
Association football defenders